Zheshart (Zövśört) is an urban locality (an urban-type settlement) in Ust-Vymsky District of the Komi Republic, Russia. As of the 2010 Census, its population was 8,561.

Administrative and municipal status
Within the framework of administrative divisions, the urban-type settlement of Zheshart, together with one rural locality (the village of Rimya), is incorporated within Ust-Vymsky District as Zheshart Urban-Type Settlement Administrative Territory (an administrative division of the district). As a municipal division, Zheshart Urban-Type Settlement Administrative Territory is incorporated within Ust-Vymsky Municipal District as Zheshart Urban Settlement.

References

Notes

Sources

Urban-type settlements in the Komi Republic
Yarensky Uyezd
